Maple Grove Township is a township in Becker County, Minnesota, United States. The population was 405 as of the 2000 census.

Geography
According to the United States Census Bureau, the township has a total area of 35.7 square miles (92.5 km2), of which 27.7 square miles (71.7 km2) is land and 8.0 square miles (20.7 km2) (22.40%) is water.

Lakes
 Bad Boy Lake
 Bass Lake
 Becker Lake
 Big Rat Lake (west edge)
 Birch Lake (east edge)
 Black Earth Lake
 Blueberry Lake
 Bow-Dodge Lake (northeast three-quarters)
 Brown Lake (east quarter)
 Cabin Lake
 Casebeer Lake (east edge)
 Cherry Lake
 Chokecherry Lake
 Fish Hook Lake
 Gooseberry Lake
 Island Lake (northeast half)
 Jack Haw Lake
 Little Bass Lake
 Little Rat Lake (west edge)
 Little Rat Lake (west quarter)
 Mallard Lake (north quarter)
 Net Lake
 Northern Lake
 Pickle Lake
 Pine Lake
 Raspberry Lake (northwest edge)
 Strawberry Lake (northwest three-quarters)
 White Earth Lake

Adjacent townships
 Oakland Township, Mahnomen County (north)
 Little Elbow Township, Mahnomen County (northeast)
 Eagle View Township (east)
 Sugar Bush Township (southeast)
 Callaway Township (southwest)
 White Earth Township (west)
 Lake Grove Township, Mahnomen County (northwest)

Demographics
As of the census of 2000, there were 405 people, 147 households, and 109 families residing in the township.  The population density was 14.6 people per square mile (5.6/km2).  There were 329 housing units at an average density of 11.9/sq mi (4.6/km2).  The racial makeup of the township was 38.77% White, 52.35% Native American, and 8.89% from two or more races. Hispanic or Latino of any race were 0.74% of the population.

There were 147 households, out of which 36.7% had children under the age of 18 living with them, 49.0% were married couples living together, 12.9% had a female householder with no husband present, and 25.2% were non-families. 21.1% of all households were made up of individuals, and 7.5% had someone living alone who was 65 years of age or older.  The average household size was 2.76 and the average family size was 3.11.

In the township the population was spread out, with 31.1% under the age of 18, 6.4% from 18 to 24, 26.4% from 25 to 44, 24.2% from 45 to 64, and 11.9% who were 65 years of age or older.  The median age was 35 years. For every 100 females, there were 104.5 males.  For every 100 females age 18 and over, there were 113.0 males.

The median income for a household in the township was $37,667, and the median income for a family was $37,500. Males had a median income of $23,000 versus $24,583 for females. The per capita income for the township was $14,359.  About 13.2% of families and 16.2% of the population were below the poverty line, including 25.7% of those under age 18 and 3.6% of those age 65 or over.

References
 United States National Atlas
 United States Census Bureau 2007 TIGER/Line Shapefiles
 United States Board on Geographic Names (GNIS)

Townships in Becker County, Minnesota
Townships in Minnesota